Llanfyllin High School (Ysgol Uwchradd Llanfyllin) is a bilingual secondary school situated in the mid-Wales town of Llanfyllin. It currently has around 1000 pupils drawn from the town and the surrounding area. About a quarter of the pupils live across the English border in Shropshire.

As a bilingual school, Llanfyllin High School has a Welsh language stream in which most subjects are taught in Welsh, and an English language stream in which most subjects are taught in English. Some courses are taught bilingually. About 19% of pupils have Welsh as their first language. A group of pupils in years 6 to 9 participate in a project named Trochi (Immersion) to increase their fluency in Welsh and allow them to transfer to the Welsh language stream.

The school closed in 2020 after many years of success. To be reopened the following school year, September 2020 as Ysgol Llanfyllin; a new age 3 to 18 years school. Merging Llanfyllin C.P. School and Llanfyllin High School, over 2 campuses.

History 
The school building lies on the grounds of the former Llwyn Hall that was demolished. The school was built in the 1950s to replace an earlier building and was considerably extended in the early 1970s. The school completed a £2.2 million extension and remodelling programme in 1998 providing a high standard of accommodation and resources.

Estyn inspection 
In 2009, the school took part in an Estyn inspection which reported GCSE examination results as well above the local and national average.

References

External links 
Official Website
Friends of Llanfyllin High School
2009 Estyn Report

Secondary schools in Powys
Llanfyllin